CBS 42 may refer to:

 KEYE-TV, Austin, Texas
 WIAT, Birmingham, Alabama